Handball Grauholz is a Swiss Handball club from Bern. It was founded in 2001 out of three original Clubs: TV Zollikofen, HBC Moosseedorf and HGTV Münchenbuchsee. Twice (2005, 2008) the 1. Team reached promotion to the NLB. In Season 04/05 it reached 1/8-final of the Swiss cup.

Club

Information

Teams

1. Team

Squad Season 08/09 
(Date: September 11. 2008)

Schedule Championship NLB 08/09

Former Players Now Playing SHL

External links 
 Official website of the club

Handball clubs established in 2001
Swiss handball clubs
2001 establishments in Switzerland
Sport in Bern